Blackwater is a city in northwest Cooper County, Missouri, United States located along the Blackwater River, from which it takes its name. The population was 162 at the 2010 census.

Many parts of Blackwater's commercial and residential districts are listed on the National Register of Historic Places.

History
Blackwater was platted in 1887, although it had long functioned as a trading point. A post office called Blackwater has been in operation since 1873.

Blackwater Commercial Historic District, Blackwater Residential Historic District, and Imhoff Archeological Site are listed on the National Register of Historic Places.

Geography
Blackwater is located along Missouri Route K two miles north of I-70. The site is on the south bank of the Blackwater River, and the community of Nelson in adjacent Saline County lies two miles to the west-northwest. Lamine is six miles to the southeast on Missouri Route 41.

Demographics

2010 census
As of the census of 2010, there were 162 people, 64 households, and 45 families living in the city. The racial makeup of the city was 95.1% White, 1.9% African American, 0.6% Native American, and 2.5% from two or more races. Hispanic or Latino of any race were 1.9% of the population.

There were 64 households, of which 35.9% had children under the age of 18 living with them, 53.1% were married couples living together, 12.5% had a female householder with no husband present, 4.7% had a male householder with no wife present, and 29.7% were non-families. 25.0% of all households were made up of individuals, and 14% had someone living alone who was 65 years of age or older. The average household size was 2.53 and the average family size was 3.02.

The median age in the city was 38.3 years. 25.3% of residents were under the age of 18; 10.6% were between the ages of 18 and 24; 22.1% were from 25 to 44; 27.2% were from 45 to 64; and 14.8% were 65 years of age or older. The gender makeup of the city was 48.1% male and 51.9% female.

2000 census
As of the census of 2000, there were 199 people, 85 households, and 57 families living in the city. The population density was 611.1 people per square mile (232.8/km2). There were 96 housing units at an average density of 294.8 per square mile (112.3/km2). The racial makeup of the city was 96.98% White, 2.51% African American and 0.50% Asian. Hispanic or Latino of any race were 0.50% of the population.

There were 85 households, out of which 28.2% had children under the age of 18 living with them, 48.2% were married couples living together, 14.1% had a female householder with no husband present, and 32.9% were non-families. 27.1% of all households were made up of individuals, and 14.1% had someone living alone who was 65 years of age or older. The average household size was 2.34 and the average family size was 2.81.

In the city the population was spread out, with 24.1% under the age of 18, 9.5% from 18 to 24, 29.6% from 25 to 44, 20.6% from 45 to 64, and 16.1% who were 65 years of age or older. The median age was 36 years. For every 100 females, there were 91.3 males. For every 100 females age 18 and over, there were 93.6 males.

The median income for a household in the city was $25,481, and the median income for a family was $26,932. Males had a median income of $25,625 versus $23,750 for females. The per capita income for the city was $13,186. About 21.3% of families and 21.1% of the population were below the poverty line, including 20.7% of those under the age of eighteen and 20.0% of those 65 or over.

References

External links
 Historic maps of Blackwater in the Sanborn Maps of Missouri Collection at the University of Missouri

Cities in Cooper County, Missouri
Cities in Missouri
Columbia metropolitan area (Missouri)